Grind is the cross-sectional shape of a blade.

Grind, grinds, or grinding may also refer to:

Grinding action
 Grinding (abrasive cutting), a method of crafting
 Grinding (dance), suggestive club dancing
 Grinding (video gaming), repetitive and uninteresting gameplay
 Bruxism, grinding of the teeth
 Grind (sport), a sliding stance usually performed in extreme sports such as aggressive skating and boardsports; Grinds (skateboarding)
 Grind (whaling), pilot whale hunting in the Faroe Islands
 Grinds, private tutoring, in Ireland
 Mill (grinding)
 Grinding, the operation of the winches on a yacht; the work done by a grinder (sailing position)

Geography
 Grind, a village in Lăpugiu de Jos Commune, Hunedoara County, Romania
 Grind (Unirea), a tributary of the Unirea in Cluj and Alba Counties, Romania

Film and TV
 Grind (2003 film), about amateur skaters
 The Grind (1915 film), a silent movie
 Grind (1997 film), starring Billy Crudup and Adrienne Shelly
 The Grind (TV series), MTV series

Music
 Grindcore, a music genre
 Grind (musical), with a story by Fay Kanin
 Grind (soundtrack), the soundtrack to the 2003 film
 MTV Grind 1, a compilation album from the series

Songs
 "Grind" (song), a grunge song by Alice in Chains
 "Grind", by Gojira from the album Fortitude
 "G.R.I.N.D (Get Ready It's a New Day)", a song by Asher Roth
 "Grindin" (Lil Wayne song), 2014
 "Grindin'", a hip-hop song by Clipse
 "Grindin'" by NF and Marty from the album Therapy Session
 "Grindin'" by Axe Murder Boyz
 "Grindin'" (featuring Ricco Barrino) by 8Ball & MJG from the album Ten Toes Down
 "Grindin'" (featuring Z-Ro & C-Mo) by Big Moe from the album Unfinished Business	
 "Grindin" (featuring Bone Crusher) by Goodie Mob from the album One Monkey Don't Stop No Show
 "Grindin" (with Shermanology) by Afrojack
 "Grindin'" (featuring Bad Azz) by Ras Kass from the album Rasassination

Other
 In the Lisp community, the pretty-printer function is called 'grind'

See also
 Grinder (disambiguation)
 Milling (disambiguation)